Roi-Namur is an island in the north part of the Kwajalein Atoll in the Marshall Islands. Today it is a major part of the Ronald Reagan Ballistic Missile Defense Test Site, hosting several radar systems used for tracking and characterizing missile reentry vehicles (RV) and their penetration aids (penaids).

Etymology
The name of the new island is after the formerly separate islands Roi and Namur were joined by landfill. Roi is originally from Marshallese Ruot, while Namur is originally from Marshallese Nim̧ur.

History
Germany annexed the Marshalls in 1885 but did not put government officials on the islands until 1906, leaving island affairs to a group of powerful German trading companies. Under the Treaty of Versailles, Japan took over after World War I. They colonised the Marshalls extensively, developing and fortifying large bases on many of the islands.

Roi-Namur was the target of the U.S. 4th Marine Division in the Battle of Kwajalein, in February 1944. During the Japanese occupation, the two islands (Roi to the west (Marshallese:) and Namur to the east) were connected by a narrow neck of land and causeway. After the American occupation, US Navy SeaBees filled the area between the islands by December 1944; the two now joined islands are presently called Roi-Namur with a total area of about one square mile.

Roi-Namur was selected by DARPA as a host site for a series of radar experiments under the Project Defender umbrella, and Project PRESS in particular. These experiments intended to use radar means to distinguish an enemy RV from its penaids though the examination of the size, shape and velocity of the objects, as well as examining the wake they left in the upper atmosphere. By building on Roi-Namur, they were able to use the test shots being used by the US Army's Nike-X program installed on Kwajalein Island and Meck Island further to the south.

The island was flooded in March 2014 by a "massive wave" which swamped coastal roads.

Today
Roi-Namur is home to an about 120 American and Marshallese employees of the Reagan Test Site.

The Roi side is the main housing area, with the retail and recreation facilities there. Activities on Roi-Namur range from a nine-hole golf course, saltwater swimming pool, scuba club, movie theater, volleyball, and basketball court. Roi hosts the Freeflight International Airport (Marshall Islands) with one runway for small planes that commute from Kwajalein bringing additional workers. Additional Marshallese daytime workers come via ferry from the island of Enniburr.

The Namur side is home to the ALCOR, ALTAIR, MMW and TRADEX radar tracking stations.

There is a small launch facility on Roi-Namur. Rockets launched here are usually sounding rockets that ascend beyond the atmosphere but have short ranges. There are crumbling remnants of Japanese blockhouses and pillboxes around Roi-Namur.

See also
List of United States National Historic Landmarks in United States commonwealths and territories, associated states, and foreign states
National Register of Historic Places listings in the Marshall Islands

References

Buildings and structures on the National Register of Historic Places in the Marshall Islands
Historic districts in the Marshall Islands
National Historic Landmarks in the Marshall Islands
Kwajalein Atoll
World War II on the National Register of Historic Places
1944 establishments in the Marshall Islands
Historic districts on the National Register of Historic Places in the Marshall Islands
Islands of the Marshall Islands